No. 1564 Flight RAF was an independent flight of the British Royal Air Force which was created on five separate occasions between 1943 and 2016 in a variety of roles.

1564 (Meteorological) Flight in World War II
No. 1564 (Meteorological) Flight was first formed at RAF Mellaha, near Tripoli, Libya, on 1 February 1943, flying Hawker Hurricanes and Supermarine Spitfires, and was disbanded at Istres, France on 15 June 1946.

1564 (Helicopter) Flight in the 1960s

No. 1564 (Helicopter) Flight was re-formed at RAF El Adem, Libya on 14 August 1963, flying Bristol Sycamores and Westland Whirlwinds, from an element of 103 Squadron, disbanding on 31 December 1966 at El Adem.

The flight was re-formed at El Adem again on 1 May 1969, from 'D' Flight of 202 Squadron, only to be disbanded again on 31 March 1970 on Cyprus.

1564 (Tactical Support) Flight on the Falklands

Following the Falklands War of 1982, the Westland Sea King search and rescue aircraft of C Flight, 202 Squadron, RAF Coltishall were deployed to provide search and rescue cover for BFFI (British Forces Falkland Islands), flying from Navy Point opposite Port Stanley. The unit had a variety of designations before formally adopting No. 1564 (Tactical Support) Flight as its title in 1983. When the Sea King and Chinook units in the Falkland Islands were combined on the opening of RAF Mount Pleasant, they took on the title of 78 Squadron.

1564 Flight was reformed in November 2007, by re-designating 78 Squadron on the departure of the Chinook aircraft from the Falklands. The Flight operated two Sea King HAR3 helicopters, with crews provided on rotation from Nos. 22 and 202 Squadrons in the UK. The Sea Kings, however, were replaced due to the SAR privatization process. AAR Corp was awarded a contract for helicopter search and rescue services in the Falkland Islands to replace 1564 Flight, they will use AgustaWestland AW189 helicopters in the role from 2016.

In March 2015, the UK announced that a pair of Chinooks would be stationed in the Falklands again.

1564 Flight disbanded on 31 March 2016 with a simple ceremony and flypast, following the privatisation of UK SAR. This represented the final ever flight of the RAF SAR Sea Kings by ZE370 and XZ593 Since official records began in 1983, the SAR operating from the Falklands have responded to 1,305 callouts and given life-saving assistance to 1,883 people.

Aircraft operated

Flight bases

See also
 RAF Search and Rescue Force
 List of Royal Air Force aircraft independent flights
 Military of the Falkland Islands

References
Notes

Bibliography

External links
Royal Air Force: 1564 Flt

1564 Flight
Military units and formations established in 1943